Matthew "Pong" J. Unitas (September 13, 1895 – October 28, 1972) was an American football guard who played for the Washington Senators of the National Football League (NFL).

References

1895 births
1972 deaths
Players of American football from Baltimore
Washington Senators (NFL) players
American football guards